Form, Fit, and Function (F3) is the identification and description of characteristics of a part or assembly. Each defines a specific aspect of the part to help engineers match parts to needs. The F3 framework increases design change flexibility by allowing changes to the part with minimal documentation and design cost as long as the fit, form and function of the product are maintained. It is a step in creating any physical product.

Definitions 
Fit refers to the ability of the part or feature to connect to, mate with, or join to another feature or part within an assembly. The “fit” allows the part to meet the required assembly tolerances to be useful.

Form refers to such characteristics as external dimensions, weight, size, and visual appearance of a part or assembly. This is the element of F3 that is most affected by an engineer's aesthetic choices, including enclosure, chassis, and control panel, that become the outward "face" of the product.

Function is a criterion that is met when the part performs its stated purpose effectively and reliably.  In an electronics product, for example, function can depend on the solid-state components used, the software or firmware, and quite often on the features of the electronics enclosure selected.  Poorly placed or sized ports and misleading or missing labeling are two of the most common ways in which an enclosure can fail the function criterion.

References

External links 
 Understanding the Role of Form, Fit, and Function
 Evaluating the Change: Form, Fit and Function (FFF)

Product design